Simon Cameron House and Bank consists of a historic home and bank building located at Middletown, Dauphin County, Pennsylvania.  The house was built about 1833, and is a -story, 3-bay, brick building with a typical half-Georgian plan.  Attached to the house is a -story, 3-bay, stone building, also with a typical half-Georgian plan.  The stone structure originally housed the Cameron Bank, chartered in 1832.  It was the primary home for the Simon Cameron (1799-1889) family from 1832 to 1855.  Simon Cameron's son J. Donald Cameron (1833-1918) was born in the house.

It was added to the National Register of Historic Places in 1976.

References

Houses on the National Register of Historic Places in Pennsylvania
Commercial buildings on the National Register of Historic Places in Pennsylvania
Houses completed in 1833
Houses in Dauphin County, Pennsylvania
National Register of Historic Places in Dauphin County, Pennsylvania